Károly Molnár (born 22 July 1953) is a Hungarian judoka. He competed at the 1976 Summer Olympics and the 1980 Summer Olympics.

References

External links
 

1953 births
Living people
Hungarian male judoka
Olympic judoka of Hungary
Judoka at the 1976 Summer Olympics
Judoka at the 1980 Summer Olympics
Sportspeople from Szabolcs-Szatmár-Bereg County
20th-century Hungarian people